Matthew Updike is an American Paralympic cyclist. In 2008 he competed for Beijing Paralympics but didn't win anything. He won two gold medals at the 2011 U.S. Paralympics Road Cycling National Championships for time trial and road race. The same year, he won two silver medals for mixed time trial and road race. At the 2012 Summer Paralympics in London, he won another gold for team relay.

References

Living people
Sportspeople from Syracuse, New York
Date of birth missing (living people)
Paralympic cyclists of the United States
Paralympic gold medalists for the United States
Medalists at the 2012 Summer Paralympics
Year of birth missing (living people)
Paralympic medalists in cycling
Cyclists at the 2008 Summer Paralympics
Cyclists at the 2012 Summer Paralympics
Medalists at the 2011 Parapan American Games